Thomas Schreiber may refer to:
 Thomas Schreiber (bobsledder), Swiss bobsledder
 Thomas Schreiber (innkeeper), German innkeeper executed for witchcraft